The Wasco Reserve were a professional baseball team based in Bakersfield, California, which began play in 2019. The team was a member of the Pecos League, an independent baseball league which is not affiliated with Major League Baseball or Minor League Baseball. The team began play in 2019 in Wasco, California. For the 2022 season, the team moved all home games to Sam Lynn Ballpark in Bakersfield, which they share with fellow Pecos League team the Bakersfield Train Robbers. After the 2022 season, the team folded.

Season By Season Record

Roster

References

External links
 Wasco Reserve website

Pecos League teams
Professional baseball teams in California
Baseball teams established in 2018
2018 establishments in California